Ghantasala is a singer of Telugu cinema. This is a compilation of few of his songs.

References 

Filmi